
Gmina Stryszów is a rural gmina (administrative district) in Wadowice County, Lesser Poland Voivodeship, in southern Poland.

Villages
Gmina Stryszów contains the villages and settlements of Dąbrówka, Łękawica, Leśnica, Stronie, Stryszów and Zakrzów.

Neighbouring gminas
Gmina Stryszów is bordered by the gminas of Budzów, Kalwaria Zebrzydowska, Lanckorona, Mucharz, Wadowice and Zembrzyce.

References
Polish official population figures 2006

Stryszow
Wadowice County